The Haute Qualité Environnementale or HQE (High Quality Environmental standard) is a standard for green building in France, based on the principles of sustainable development first set out at the 1992 Earth Summit. The standard is controlled by the Paris-based Association pour la Haute Qualité Environnementale (ASSOHQE).

Coverage
The standard specifies criteria for the following:

Managing the impacts on the outdoor environment
 Harmonious relationship between buildings and their immediate environment
 Integrated choice of construction methods and materials
 The avoidance of nuisance by the construction site.
 Minimizing energy use
 Minimizing water use
 Minimizing waste in operations
 Minimizing building maintenance and repair

Creating a pleasant indoor environment
 Hydrothermal control measures
 Acoustic control measures
 Visual attractiveness
 Measures to control smells
 Hygiene and cleanliness of the indoor spaces
 Air quality controls
 Water quality controls

Future development
On 16 June 2009, it was announced that the CSTB (Centre Scientifique et Technique du Batiment) and its subsidiary CertiVéA had signed a memorandum of understanding to work together with the global arm of the United Kingdom's Building Research Establishment (BRE) to develop a pan-European building environmental assessment method. The BRE developed and markets (BREEAM (the BRE Environmental Assessment Method), which has similarities to the French HQE. Unfortunately, BREEAM and HQE are still disseminating their own standards round the world, leaving little doubt that no pan-European method will emerge in the near future, at least stemming from these two organisations.

International development
Since 2013, the HQE brand is now available for buildings and districts worldwide.
As of 2016 HQE is present in 24 countries.

See also

Green building
Sustainable architecture
Sustainable design

External links

Association pour la Haute Qualité Environnementale
Sustainable Building Alliance

References

Energy conservation in France
Building engineering
France
Sustainable building rating systems